Peter Briggs (born 23 February 1992) is a badminton player from England. In 2019, he started to represent Canada.

Achievements

BWF Grand Prix (1 title) 
The BWF Grand Prix has two levels, the BWF Grand Prix and Grand Prix Gold. It is a series of badminton tournaments sanctioned by the Badminton World Federation (BWF) since 2007.

Men's doubles

  BWF Grand Prix Gold tournament
  BWF Grand Prix tournament

BWF International Challenge/Series (3 titles, 9 runners-up) 
Men's doubles

Mixed doubles

  BWF International Challenge tournament
  BWF International Series tournament
  BWF Future Series tournament

External links

References 

English male badminton players
Canadian male badminton players
Sportspeople from Leicester
English emigrants to Canada
1992 births
Living people